Le Petit Tlemcenien was a French language weekly newspaper published from Tlemcen, Algeria, serving the local Jewish community. It was founded in 1882.

References

Publications established in 1882
French-language newspapers published in Algeria
Newspapers published in Algeria
Jewish newspapers
Jews and Judaism in Algeria
1882 establishments in Algeria